The following is a list of announcers who called Major League Baseball telecasts for the joint venture (lasting for the 1994–1995 seasons) between Major League Baseball, ABC and NBC called The Baseball Network. Announcers who represented each of the teams playing in the respective games were typically paired with each other on regular season Baseball Night in America telecasts.  ABC used Al Michaels, Jim Palmer, Tim McCarver and Lesley Visser as the lead broadcasting team. Meanwhile, NBC used Bob Costas, Joe Morgan, Bob Uecker and Jim Gray as their lead broadcasting team.

A
Joe Angel
Jack Arute (field reporter for ABC)
Richie Ashburn

B
Johnny Bench (field reporter for NBC, 1994)
Chris Berman
Steve Blass
Bert Blyleven
Marty Brennaman
Thom Brennaman
Steve Busby
Joe Buck

C
Dave Campbell
Harry Caray
Skip Caray
Herb Carneal
Bob Carpenter
Rick Cerone
Tom Cheek 
Gary Cohen
Jerry Coleman
Bob Costas

D
Rick Dempsey
Larry Dierker
Camille Dube

E
Dick Enberg

F
Ron Fairly
Mike Flanagan
Lanny Frattare
George Frazier

G
Joe Garagiola
George Grande
Jim Gray (field reporter for NBC)
Hank Greenwald
Greg Gumbel (NBC's Baseball Night in America host, 1994)

H
Milo Hamilton
Tom Hamilton
Tom Hammond
Ken Harrelson
Ernie Harwell
Keith Hernandez
Jim Hughson
Al Hrabosky
Jim Hunter
Tommy Hutton

K
Jim Kaat
Paul Kennedy
Bill King
Harry Kalas
Duane Kuiper

M
Garry Maddox
Buck Martinez
Denny Matthews
Tim McCarver 
Sean McDonough
Al Michaels 
Jon Miller
Rick Monday
Bob Montgomery
Joe Morgan 
Bobby Murcer 
Bob Murphy
Brent Musburger

N
Dave Niehaus

P
Steve Palermo
Jim Palmer
Greg Papa
Steve Physioc

R
Claude Raymond
Jerry Remy
Ted Robinson
John Rooney

S
Billy Sample
John Saunders (ABC's Baseball Night in America host)
Mike Schmidt
Ken Singleton
Lary Sorensen
Paul Splittorff
Dewayne Staats
Dick Stockton
Hannah Storm (field reporter for NBC, 1994; NBC's Baseball Night in America host; 1995)

T
Gary Thorne
Roger Twibell

U
Bob Uecker

V
Dave Van Horne
Pete Van Wieren
Lesley Visser (field reporter for ABC)

W
Suzyn Waldman
John Wathan
Chris Wheeler
Ken Wilson

Z
Steve Zabriskie

Baseball Night in America commentator pairings

1994 schedule 
All games aired on ABC; due to the strike NBC was unable to air its slate of games, which were supposed to begin on August 26.

1995 schedule

ABC scheduled games

NBC scheduled games

Postseason

1995 American League Division Series broadcasters

1995 National League Division Series broadcasters

1995 League Championship Series broadcasters

ALCS

NLCS

1995 World Series broadcasters

See also

List of Atlanta Braves broadcasters
List of Baltimore Orioles broadcasters
List of Boston Red Sox broadcasters
List of Chicago Cubs broadcasters
List of Chicago White Sox broadcasters
List of Cincinnati Reds broadcasters
List of Cleveland Indians broadcasters
List of Colorado Rockies broadcasters
List of Detroit Tigers broadcasters
List of Houston Astros broadcasters
List of Kansas City Royals broadcasters
List of Los Angeles Angels of Anaheim broadcasters
List of Los Angeles Dodgers broadcasters
List of Miami Marlins broadcasters
List of Milwaukee Brewers broadcasters
List of Minnesota Twins broadcasters
List of Montreal Expos broadcasters
List of New York Mets broadcasters
List of New York Yankees broadcasters
List of Oakland Athletics broadcasters
List of Philadelphia Phillies broadcasters
List of Pittsburgh Pirates broadcasters
List of San Diego Padres broadcasters
List of San Francisco Giants broadcasters
List of Seattle Mariners broadcasters
List of St. Louis Cardinals broadcasters
List of Texas Rangers broadcasters
List of Toronto Blue Jays broadcasters

References

External links
Searchable Network TV Broadcasts

Lists of Major League Baseball broadcasters
Major League Baseball on NBC
ABC Sports